Steven Robert Miller (born September 24, 1957 in Buffalo, New York) is a Lansing, Michigan-based musician, journalist and author. His 2013 book Detroit Rock City: The Uncensored History of Rock 'n' Roll in America's Loudest City reached No. 5 on Amazon in the rock and roll bestsellers category. His most recent releases include Murder in Grosse Pointe Park: Privilege, Adultery, and the Killing of Jane Bashara (2015, Penguin/Berkley), a true crime title exploring the death of Jane Bashara, and Juggalo: Insane Clown Posse, Their Fans, and the World They Made (2016, Da Capo Press), a detailed look at Insane Clown Posse and their dedicated fanbase.

Miller has worked as a metro reporter for the Dallas Morning News and as a national reporter for the Washington Times, as well as writing for People and U.S. News & World Report. He covered the auto industry for Brandweek and is currently an investigative reporter with Texas Watchdog.org.

He has written and edited books on crime and music, including Girl, Wanted: The Chase for Sarah Pender; Nobody's Women: The Crimes and Victims of Anthony Sowell, the Cleveland Serial Killer; Commando: The Autobiography of Johnny Ramone; and Touch and Go: The Complete Hardcore Punk Zine '79–'83 .

Detroit Rock City, a book stocked with verbatim quotes from Detroit rock legends, was published in June 2013. The book received positive reviews from the Wall Street Journal, among other national and international publications.

Early life
Miller was born in Buffalo, the only child of Boyd and Julie Miller, a newspaper man and a high school teacher. The family eventually settled in Lansing, Michigan, where his father became a journalism professor at Michigan State University.

Music
Miller was the vocalist in the hardcore punk band the Fix, which he co-founded in Lansing in March 1980 with bassist Mike Achtenberg. The Fix were the first band signed to Touch and Go Records. Miller intended to be the guitarist in the band when he and Achtenberg began assembling personnel, but when guitarist Craig Calvert answered their ad posted in a laundromat, he proved so talented that Miller agreed to sing instead.

The Fix released two 7" records, the single "Vengeance" b/w "In This Town" (March 1981) and the four-song EP Jan's Rooms (January 1982), both on Touch and Go. They also contributed the song "No Idols" to the 1981 Touch and Go compilation EP Process of Elimination. The first Fix single is among the most collectible hardcore records in the world, at one point fetching $4,250 on eBay.

The band was among the first hardcore bands to tour the U.S., obtaining a contact list from Chuck Dukowski of Black Flag and D.O.A. manager Ken Lester. During the band's first tour in summer 1981, the Fix shared bills with Dead Kennedys, Flipper, D.O.A. and T.S.O.L. A second tour later that year included a show with Toxic Reasons. On New Year's Eve 1981, the Fix played a warehouse concert with Flipper, Dead Kennedys, the Effigies and Anti-Pasti. It was the Fix's final show.

In early 1982, Miller and Achtenberg formed Blight, which also featured Tesco Vee of the Meatmen as vocalist. During the band's four-month existence, they performed a dozen shows in the Detroit area, and recorded an eponymous EP in the basement studio of Corey Rusk, which was released posthumously in 1983.

In 1983, Miller played guitar briefly in Strange Fruit, which also featured Steve Shelley of Sonic Youth on drums. They issued one three-song 7" single with Miller, "On Top of a Hill" (1983, Babel Records).

Journalism
Miller began writing as a reviewer for Your Flesh magazine in 1991. The next year, he submitted a freelance story to the St. Petersburg Times, which published it. Miller soon began writing for other area publications, including Players, an entertainment weekly. His clips from alternative newsweeklies like the Dallas Observer and Houston Press earned him his first newspaper job at the McKinney Courier-Gazette in McKinney, Texas.

After moving to the Dallas Morning News, Miller covered cops and courts and also did some work for the state desk, including coverage of the Oklahoma City tornadoes in 1998. He moved to the Washington Times in 2000 as a national reporter. For the next four years, Miller covered some of the biggest stories in the U.S., including the 2000 United States presidential election recount in Florida, Hillary Clinton's senatorial campaign in New York and the riots during the 2000 Democratic National Convention in Los Angeles. He was one of the first journalists from outside of New York to arrive at Ground Zero in the wake of 9/11, coming into the shuttered city on a train that had been reserved for Amtrak employees to get home to New York the night of September 11. Miller also delivered a series on the rise of wealth among African-Americans in the U.S., which the New York Times nominated for the Pulitzer Prize in 2001.

In 2006, Miller joined Brandweek, a business-to-business magazine that was part of the Nielsen Business Media chain. He covered the auto industry, delivering stories on the branding and marketing of cars both in the U.S. and abroad. In 2009, he joined Texas Watchdog, a fledgling investigative news agency based in Houston, Texas. The Society of American Business Editors and Writers selected Miller's 2011 coverage of the Texas Windstorm Insurance Association, which resulted in a state takeover of the agency, as the winner of its award for digital investigation.

Bibliography
 A Slaying in the Suburbs: The Tara Grant Murder (2009, Penguin/Berkley)
 Touch and Go: The Complete Hardcore Punk Zine '79–'83  (2010, Bazillion Points)
 Girl, Wanted: The Chase for Sarah Pender (2011, Penguin/Berkley)
 Commando: The Autobiography of Johnny Ramone (2012, Abrams Books)
 Nobody's Women: The Crimes and Victims of Anthony Sowell, the Cleveland Serial Killer (2012, Penguin/Berkley)
 Detroit Rock City: The Uncensored History of Rock 'n' Roll in America's Loudest City (2013, Da Capo Press)
 Murder in Grosse Pointe Park: Privilege, Adultery, and the Killing of Jane Bashara (2015, Penguin/Berkley)
 Juggalo: Insane Clown Posse, Their Fans, and the World They Made (2016, Da Capo Press)

Discography

The Fix
 "Vengeance" 7" single (1981, Touch and Go Records)
 Jan's Rooms 7" EP (1982, Touch and Go Records)
 Cold Days compilation album (1990, Lost and Found Records)
 At the Speed of Twisted Thought... compilation album (2006, Touch and Go Records)

Blight
 Blight 7" EP (1983, Touch and Go Records)
 Detroit : The Dream Is Dead - The Collected Works of a Midwest Hardcore Noise Band 1982 compilation album (2006, Touch and Go Records)

Strange Fruit
 "On Top of a Hill" 7" single (1983, Babel Records)

References

External links 
 The Past is Present, Steve Miller's Official Blog
 City Pulse feature
 State News story
 Steve Miller interview in Chunklet
 "Girl Wanted" review
 The Fix discography
 Dementlieu Punk Archive. The Fix Discography and Steve Miller interviews

1957 births
American crime writers
American male journalists
Living people
Writers from Buffalo, New York
Writers from Lansing, Michigan
The Dallas Morning News people
Journalists from New York (state)